William Austin Ligon (born ca. 1951) is the co-founder and retired CEO of CarMax.  He retired in June 2006, and is now a private angel-stage investor. Among his recent investments are Gazelle, Redfin, Rev.com, Car Trade (India), Eneza Education (Kenya) and Tazza Kitchen.

Life and career
Ligon and Richard Sharp, then CEO of Circuit City, developed the CarMax idea together in 1991 and launched the first CarMax store in Richmond, Virginia, in 1993.  Austin became Sr. VP of Automotive in 1992, and President of CarMax in 1995.  He led the company through a decade and a half of rapid growth, including its IPO as a tracking stock of Circuit City in 1997. He added the title of CEO upon the company’s spin off from Circuit City in 2002. Ligon came to Circuit City from Marriott Corporation where he had been senior vice president of strategic planning for Marriott Hotels and Resorts.  He joined Marriott in 1984 as director of corporate planning, and served as vice president of both marketing and concept general management in the family restaurant division.

Ligon was previously a senior consultant for the Boston Consulting Group in London, England, from 1980 to 1983 and an independent financial consultant in Bangkok, Thailand during 1983-84.  He worked as a health economist in Dallas and San Antonio during 1976-78, and was a Teaching Fellow in economics at the University of Texas at Austin from 1973 to 1976.

Civic Involvement
The primary focus of Ligon's community involvement is education.  He is a member of the governing board of St. John’s College (Annapolis and Santa Fe), and, formerly, The University of Virginia and the University of Virginia Investment Management Company (UVIMCO).  He was formerly an advisory board member of the Yale School of Management, the Plan II Honors Program at the University of Texas Austin, and advisory board chairman of the Center for Talented Youth (CTY) at Johns Hopkins University   Ligon created the “Ligon-Lamsam International Study Abroad” fund at the University of Texas at Austin.  He also serves on the board of several venture start-up companies.

Education
Ligon earned a B.A. in 1973 from the Plan II Honors program at the University of Texas at Austin, where he was elected to Phi Beta Kappa and was a member of the Tejas Club.  He received a lifetime achievement award at The Tejas Club's 85th anniversary in October 2010.  He studied at the Pontificia Universidad Catolica del Peru in Lima, Peru in 1972/73.  He subsequently earned his M.A. in Economics in 1978 from the University of Texas at Austin, and an M.B.A. in 1980 from the Yale School of Management.

References

External links
 Yale SOM: the CarMax Case 
 NPR Entrepreneurial Life Interview

University of Texas at Austin College of Liberal Arts alumni
Yale School of Management alumni
Angel investors
Robert E. Lee High School (Midland, Texas) alumni
American retail chief executives
1950s births
Year of birth uncertain
Living people